Clement "Nana" Attakora-Gyan (born March 27, 1989), known as Nana Attakora and later Clement Attakora, is a Canadian former soccer player and coach, formerly a player and later assistant manager and director of player personnel of Oakland Roots.

Career

Professional
Born in North York, Ontario, Attakora trained with Everton of the English Premier League during the summer of 2007, prior to signing for Toronto FC. He played in five MLS Reserve Division games in his debut season, but suffered from a groin injury for the last part of the season, preventing him from making his first team debut until August 9, 2008, when he played against Colorado Rapids. Attakora scored his first career goal vs. Colorado Rapids on September 12, 2009.

Attakora went on to have a very successful campaign with Toronto FC in 2009, working his way into the starting eleven and being voted in by supporters as Toronto FC player of the month for June. With the addition of fellow Canadian International Adrian Cann in the 2010 season the defensive partnership has become one of the strongest in the league. As his contract approached expiry at the end of the 2011 season, it was heavily rumoured that he was looking to move to Europe with his newfound success after he turned down a contract that the Canadian club had offered in November. He later assured the fans that he had no plans on leaving Toronto and that he was waiting for increased stability with the coaching staff.

In July 2011, Attakora was traded to San Jose Earthquakes in a multi-player deal. At season's end, Attakora was out of contract and exploring options abroad, after trials with Hibernian and received a contract offer from 1. FC Union Berlin, Attakora decided he wanted to remain in Major League Soccer.

On August 30, 2012, it was announced that Attakora had signed with Haka of Finland's Veikkausliiga. After Haka was relegated at the end of the season, Attakora returned to Major League Soccer and signed with San Jose Earthquakes on February 22, 2013. Attakora made his first return appearance on March 23 with a stand out 90 minute performance in a 1–0 victory over Seattle Sounders FC .

Attakora was not re-signed by San Jose and entered the 2013 MLS Re-Entry Draft in December 2013. He was selected by D.C. United and signed with the club in January 2014. He failed to make a regular season appearance and was mainly reduced to  cup matches and CONCACAF Champions League appearances.

Attakora joined NASL club San Antonio Scorpions on February 25, 2015. He made his debut for San Antonio on April 4 against the Tampa Bay Rowdies.

Attakora joined NASL side Fort Lauderdale Strikers on December 29, 2015.

Attakora made his return to Canada on 10 January 2018, signing with the Ottawa Fury of the United Soccer League. After the 2018 season, the Fury would announce that Attakora would return to the Fury for the 2019 season. After two seasons with the Fury, the club would cease operations for the 2020 season, making Attakora a free agent.

In February 2020, Attakora signed with Oakland Roots SC of the National Independent Soccer Association.

International
Attakora has represented Canada at U-16, U-17, U-19, U-20 and U-23 levels. In December 2009, Nana won the Canadian U-20 Players of the Year award for the second consecutive year. Nana made his senior national team debut in a friendly match against Jamaica on January 31, 2010. Attakora received his first call-up to the national team in over a year for the final two matches against Saint Kitts and Nevis in the opening group stage of World Cup Qualifying. After failing to play in the first game Attakora came on as a sub for Nikolas Ledgerwood on November 15, 2011 in a 4–0 victory for Canada.

On June 27, 2013 Attakora was listed as a part of the confirmed 23-man squad for Colin Miller's Canada squad for 2013 CONCACAF Gold Cup. The CSA announced July 6 that Kyle Porter would replace Attakora in the Gold Cup due to an ongoing concussion worry that prevented him from even attending the training camp.

Attakora would return to the pitch for Canada in a friendly against Iceland on January 16, 2015. He played the full 90 in a 1–2 loss.

Managerial career
When he retired on November 17, 2020 he immediately stepped up to the post of assistant manager at Oakland Roots.

Honours

Toronto FC
Canadian Championship (3): 2009, 2010, 2011

San Francisco Deltas
2017

Individual
Canadian U-20 Players of the Year: 2008, 2009

Career statistics

Club

International

References

External links
 
 

1989 births
Living people
Black Canadian soccer players
Canadian soccer players
Canadian expatriate soccer players
Canada men's youth international soccer players
Canada men's under-23 international soccer players
Canada men's international soccer players
Association football defenders
Canadian people of Ghanaian descent
Sportspeople from North York
Soccer players from Toronto
Toronto FC players
San Jose Earthquakes players
FC Haka players
D.C. United players
San Antonio Scorpions players
Fort Lauderdale Strikers players
Expatriate soccer players in the United States
Expatriate footballers in Finland
Major League Soccer players
Veikkausliiga players
North American Soccer League players
York University alumni
San Francisco Deltas players
Ottawa Fury FC players
Oakland Roots SC players
Oakland Roots SC coaches
National Independent Soccer Association players
USL Championship coaches
Canadian soccer coaches